The 1944 Great Atlantic hurricane was a destructive and powerful tropical cyclone that swept across a large portion of the United States East Coast in September 1944. New England was most affected, though so were the Outer Banks, Mid-Atlantic states, and the Canadian Maritimes. The storm's ferocity and path drew comparisons to the 1938 Long Island Express, one of the worst storms in New England history.

Its precursor was first identified well east of the Lesser Antilles on September 4, but the disturbance only became well organized enough to be considered a tropical cyclone on September 9 northeast of the Virgin Islands. Tracking west-northwest, the storm gradually intensified, curved northward, and reached peak intensity as a Category 5 hurricane on September 13 north of the Bahamas. A day later, the storm passed the Outer Banks and later made landfall on Long Island and Rhode Island as a weaker hurricane on September 15. The storm eventually became an extratropical cyclone, moving northeast, and merged with another extratropical system off Greenland on September 16.

Meteorological history

The origins of the 1944 hurricane can be traced back to a tropical wave first identified well east of the Lesser Antilles on September 4. Over the next few days, the disturbance slowly traversed west-northwestward without producing any significant weather that would hint at tropical cyclogenesis. On September 7, an area of low pressure, albeit disorganized, formed in association with the tropical wave east of Barbados. The following day, the barometric depression became more well-defined, prompting the Weather Bureau in San Juan, Puerto Rico to issue advisories on the tropical disturbance. As a result of the sparseness of available surface observations east of the Lesser Antilles, a reconnaissance flight was dispatched to investigate the storm late on September 9; the flight reported that the disturbance had strengthened into a newly formed but fully-fledged hurricane.

After formation, the tropical cyclone gradually intensified as it slowly moved west-northwestward, reaching the threshold for hurricane intensity at 06:00 UTC on September 10 while north of the Virgin Islands. Strengthening continued thereafter, and by September 12, the storm reached an intensity equivalent to a Category 3 hurricane on the modern-day Saffir–Simpson hurricane wind scale. Later that day, the cyclone strengthened further into a Category 4-equivalent and was given the moniker of "Great Atlantic hurricane" by the Weather Bureau in Miami, Florida. Concurrently, the tropical cyclone began to curve and accelerate towards the north. The storm's pressure may have been lower during its lifespan, though the  pressure suggested by meteorologist Ivan Ray Tannehill was considered too low.

The hurricane began to gradually weaken after reaching peak intensity on September 13. After crossing Rhode Island and Massachusetts, the tropical system transitioned into an extratropical cyclone off the coast of Maine on September 15; these extratropical remnants continued to track towards the northeast and across the Canadian Maritimes before they were last noted merging with another extratropical cyclone off of Greenland at 12:00 UTC on September 16.

Preparations
Upon being designated a tropical cyclone, the Weather Bureau began advising extreme caution to shipping within the expected path of the hurricane. Precaution was also urged in the eastern Bahamas. The first hurricane warning issued by the Weather Bureau in association with the storm was for the northern Bahamas on September 12. In Miami, Florida, the American Red Cross began preparing its resources for a potential regional calamity; however, the Weather Bureau did not necessarily anticipate the storm striking Miami. Royal Air Force aircraft stationed in Nassau were flown to Miami in order to avoid the storm. Although tropical cyclone naming was not in practice at the time, the Weather Bureau in Miami, Florida, began naming the system the "Great Atlantic hurricane" in their public advisories on September 12 to better convey the life-threatening risks associated with the powerful hurricane. The following day, storm warnings were issued for areas from the United States East Coast from Savannah, Georgia to Cape Hatteras. Small craft in offshore areas further south were advised to remain in port. As Morehead City, North Carolina was forecast to be submerged under several feet of water, the city's entire population was evacuated; other resort locales along the coast of North Carolina were also evacuated. Similarly, the 3000–4000 personnel constituting Marine Corps Air Station Cherry Point were evacuated inland; U.S. Army and Navy aircraft were also sent inland.

As the hurricane was passing near the Outer Banks, hurricane warnings were extended as far north as Portland, Maine, and storm warnings were issued as far north as Eastport, Maine. Precautions across New England and Mid-Atlantic states began in earnest once the storm began tracking northwards. Sixty buses were readied in Ocean City, Maryland to evacuate the seaside resort's permanent and tourist residents. The 3,000 residents of Fire Island, one of the barrier islands off of Long Island, were ordered to evacuate the islet. Nearby, the Brooklyn Red Cross Chapter began readying for possible relief work, stocking five mobile canteens with emergency rations. The United States First Naval District were directed to have personnel and rescue craft on standby to respond to emergencies. The Massachusetts State Police began relaying Weather Bureau bulletins to local public services via telecommunications. Personnel on duty were called back to barracks for later deployment in relief operations. The Massachusetts National Guard were ordered to standby and prepare for potential assistance of regional emergency services. Other Massachusetts state agencies were also allocating resources to aid in relief operations.

Impact

North Carolina and Virginia
Passing close to the Outer Banks and Hampton Roads area, strong hurricane-force winds were reported across eastern North Carolina and southeastern Virginia. The impacts of the hurricane in North Carolina were limited to areas east of the 77th meridian west. There, strong winds caused about $1 million in crop damage and $450,000 in property damage. The strong winds knocked out telecommunications networks on the Outer Banks, with telephone lines in Manteo, North Carolina and Elizabeth City, North Carolina destroyed by the storm. Small homes in the two cities were also leveled by the winds. Power outages impacted New Bern, North Carolina. Coastal farmland was inundated, with damage to corn and other crops initially estimated at "thousands of dollars."

New Jersey Shore
The hurricane was infamous for the amount of damage it caused along the New Jersey coastline. The shore towns on Long Beach Island, as well as Barnegat, Atlantic City, Ocean City, and Cape May all suffered major damage. Long Beach Island, Barnegat Island and Brigantine all lost their causeways to the mainland in the storm effectively cutting them off from the rest of New Jersey. Additionally both islands lost hundreds of homes, in particular the Harvey Cedars section of Long Beach Island where many homes in the town were swept out to sea. In Atlantic City the hurricane's storm surge forced water into the lobbies of many of the resorts' famous hotels. The Atlantic City boardwalk suffered major damage along with the Boardwalk Hall Auditorium Organ and the city's famous ocean piers. Both the famed Steel Pier and Heinz Pier were partially destroyed by the hurricane with only the Steel Pier getting rebuilt. Ocean City and Cape May also lost many homes in the storm with Ocean City's boardwalk suffering significant damage. Larry Savadove devotes a whole chapter in his book Great Storms of the Jersey Shore to the hurricane and the imprint and lore it left on the Jersey Shore.

New England
Tobacco and fruit damage in Connecticut totaled to about $2 million (1944 USD), with similar overall damage costs occurring in Rhode Island. More than $5 million (1944 USD) in damage which occurred on Cape Cod can be attributed to lost boats, as well as fallen trees and utility damage. A total of 28 people died throughout New England as a result of the storm. In Bath, Maine, a 10-year-old boy was electrocuted when he came into contact with downed wires. In Augusta, Maine, a 40-year-old woman was run over by a bicyclist who was blinded by heavy rains. 4.34 inches of rain fell during the storm at Bates College. Many tree limbs were downed by high winds during the storm, and in Androscoggin County, Maine, 40% of the apple crop was destroyed.

Hey Bonnie Hall, the mansion built by Russell Warren for the DeWolf family in Bristol, Rhode Island, was damaged beyond repair and demolished later in 1944.

USS Warrington and other ships
The hurricane and the sinking of USS Warrington are documented in the 1996 book The Dragon's Breath - Hurricane At Sea, written by Commander Robert A. Dawes, Jr. (a former Commanding Officer of Warrington), and published by Naval Institute Press.

In addition to Warrington, the Coast Guard cutters USCGC Bedloe (WSC-128) and USCGC Jackson (WSC-142) both capsized and sank off Cape Hatteras. Seventy-five men managed to escape onto life rafts from Bedloe and Jackson, but only 32 survived the rough seas and subsequent hours of exposure to be rescued two days later. The  minesweeper YMS-409 foundered and sank killing all 33 on board, while the lightship Vineyard Sound (LV-73) was sunk with the loss of all twelve aboard. YAG-17, a full sized attack transport simulator permanently moored in Lynnhaven Roads, near Little Creek, Virginia, was wrecked. Finally, the hurricane drove the SS Thomas Tracy aground in Rehoboth Beach, Delaware.

See also

List of Category 5 Atlantic hurricanes
Hurricane Belle
Hurricane Gloria
Hurricane Bob

References

Further reading

External links
 Photos of the damage to the New Jersey shore after the 1944 Great Atlantic Hurricane
 1944 Great Atlantic Hurricane HPC rainfall site
 NOAA Hurricane Research Division’s Re-analysis Project

1940s Atlantic hurricane seasons
Category 5 Atlantic hurricanes
Hurricanes in Delaware
Hurricanes in North Carolina
Hurricanes in Rhode Island
Great Atlantic Hurricane
1944 in North Carolina
1944 in Delaware
1944 meteorology